John Edward Dixon (31 March 1887 – 26 May 1947) was an Australian rules footballer who played with Essendon in the Victorian Football League (VFL).

Notes

External links 

1887 births
1947 deaths
Australian rules footballers from Victoria (Australia)
Essendon Football Club players